Willy Grondin (born 12 October 1974) is a French former professional footballer who played as a goalkeeper.

Career

Nantes
Grondin's years with FC Nantes were his longest spent with any club. From 1998 to 2004 he helped his club stay in the French First Division while also winning two national cups in 1999 and 2000 and one championship in 2001. Internationally, he played his 2000–2002 seasons in Division 1, and also took part in the UEFA Champions League for FC Nantes.

Le Mans
Grondin was eventually loaned to the Le Mans UC72 and played for a full season with them, catching the attention of the Valenciennes FC, who purchased him the next year.

Valenciennes
Grondin played for Valenciennes FC and helped them to win the French Second Division, hence earning Valenciennes entrance to the French First Division, which they had been denied from for more than a decade. In the 2006–07 season, Grondin was moved to second choice goalkeeper, replaced by Nicolas Penneteau.

Paris Saint-Germain
After terminating his contract with Valenciennes on 9 July 2009, the goalkeeper signed a one-year deal with Paris Saint-Germain F.C.

References

External links

1974 births
Living people
Footballers from Réunion
Association football goalkeepers
French footballers
FC Nantes players
Le Mans FC players
Valenciennes FC players
Paris Saint-Germain F.C. players
Ligue 1 players